Hassine Ayari (born July 4, 1985) is an amateur Tunisian Greco-Roman wrestler, who competes in the men's heavyweight category. Ayari represented Tunisia at the 2012 Summer Olympics in London, where he competed in the men's 96 kg class. He defeated Morocco's Choucri Atafi in the preliminary round of sixteen, before losing out in the quarterfinal match to Cuban wrestler and Pan American Games champion Yunior Estrada, who was able to score one point each in two straight periods, leaving Ayari without a single point.

References

External links
Profile – International Wrestling Database
NBC Olympics Profile

1985 births
Living people
Tunisian male sport wrestlers
Olympic wrestlers of Tunisia
Wrestlers at the 2012 Summer Olympics
Sportspeople from Tunis
21st-century Tunisian people